Novoseoci is a village in the municipality of Sokolac, Bosnia and Herzegovina with cold and temperate climate.

References

Populated places in Sokolac